The United States Senate election in Alabama of 1950 was held on November 7, 1950. 

Incumbent Senator J. Lister Hill was re-elected for a third term in office, defeating retired U.S. Navy Rear Admiral John G. Crommelin, who ran as an independent candidate.

General election

Results

References

1950
Alabama
United States Senate